Joel Shankle (March 2, 1933 – April 8, 2015) was an American athlete who competed mainly in the 110 meter hurdles. He competed for the United States in the 1956 Summer Olympics held in Melbourne, Australia in the 110 meter hurdles where he won the bronze medal. Shankle attended Duke University and was honored as the first ACC Male Athlete of the Year in 1954. He was also a graduate of Randolph-Macon Academy, which honored him as their Distinguished Alumnus of the Year in 2013.

References

Joel Shankle's obituary

1933 births
2015 deaths
American male hurdlers
Olympic bronze medalists for the United States in track and field
Athletes (track and field) at the 1956 Summer Olympics
Duke University alumni
Medalists at the 1956 Summer Olympics